Antigone cubensis, sometimes called the Cuban flightless crane,  
is a large, extinct species of crane which was endemic to the island of Cuba in the Caribbean. The species was originally placed in the genus Grus, as Grus cubensis, however subsequent study of the genus resulted in moving the species to Antigone in 2020.  Subfossil remains were found in Pleistocene deposits in Pinar del Rio.  Probably derived from an early invasion of sandhill cranes from North America, it differed from that species by, as well as larger size, having a proportionately broader bill, stockier legs, and with reduced wings and pectoral girdle indicating that it may have been flightless. Currently, the only extant Caribbean crane is the Cuban sandhill crane, Antigone canadensis nesiotes, an endangered subspecies of sandhill crane endemic to the country.

References

Grus (genus)
Extinct birds of the Caribbean
Extinct animals of Cuba
Extinct flightless birds
Birds of Cuba
Endemic birds of Cuba
Pleistocene birds
Fossil taxa described in 1971